The 2022 Kansas gubernatorial election took place on November 8, 2022, to elect the governor of Kansas, with primary elections taking place on August 2, 2022. Democratic Governor Laura Kelly ran for re-election to a second term. Both Kelly and Republican State Attorney General Derek Schmidt won their respective nominations with little opposition. Libertarian Seth Cordell and independent Dennis Pyle were also on the ballot. 

This was the only Democratic-held governorship up for election in 2022 in a state carried by Donald Trump in the 2020 presidential election, and the race was expected to be one of the most competitive gubernatorial races in the nation. Some analysts and Kansas Republican Party officials had also predicted that Pyle, who was on the ballot as an independent politician, would have a spoiler effect benefiting Kelly.

Kelly won re-election to a second term. This was the first gubernatorial election in Kansas since 1986 in which the winner was from the same party as the incumbent president.

Democratic primary

Candidates

Nominated
Laura Kelly, incumbent governor (2019–present)
 Running mate: David Toland, incumbent lieutenant governor (2021–present) and Secretary of Commerce (2019–present)

Eliminated in primary
Richard Karnowski, accountant
 Running mate: Barry Franco

Endorsements

Results

Republican primary

Candidates

Nominated
Derek Schmidt, Kansas Attorney General (2011–2023)
 Running mate: Katie Sawyer, political staffer

Eliminated in primary
Arlyn Briggs, perennial candidate
 Running mate: Lance Berland, candidate for the U.S. Senate in 2020

Withdrew
Jeff Colyer, former governor (2018–2019) and former lieutenant governor (2011–2018) (endorsed Schmidt)
Chase LaPorte,  businessman

Declined
Wink Hartman, businessman and nominee for lieutenant governor in 2018
Kris Kobach, former Kansas Secretary of State (2011–2019), nominee for governor in 2018, and candidate for the U.S. Senate in 2020 (running for Kansas Attorney General)
Jerry Moran, U.S. Senator (2011–present) (running for re-election)
Ron Ryckman Jr., Speaker of the Kansas House of Representatives (2017–2023) from the 78th district (2013–2023) (endorsed Schmidt)

Endorsements

Polling

Results

Independent

Candidates

Declared
Dennis Pyle, state senator from the 1st district, former Republican (2005–present)
Kathleen Garrison, Clearwater school board member

General election

Campaign 
Reporters noted the lack of attention towards abortion as an issue in the campaign by both major candidates, despite the defeat of an abortion amendment in August which was widely seen as a prominent victory for the pro-choice movement. In televised debates, Schmidt said that he respected the referendum results and accused Kelly of opposing existing abortion restrictions. Kelly denied the accusation, saying that she had stayed consistent on the subject, and further adding that she believed in "bodily autonomy" for women. When pressed on whether they would support retaining all justices in the state Supreme Court who ruled abortion as a fundamental constitutional right in 2019 and were up on the ballot, Kelly said that she would, while Schmidt said he would vote to retain some and not others.

Instead, both candidates focused more on "kitchen-table" issues such as the economy and education, where polls showed that the former of which was the most important concern among voters. Kelly's campaign tied Schmidt with former Governor Sam Brownback and his Kansas experiment, highlighting Schmidt's defense of lawsuits regarding budget cuts to public education as the Attorney General. In the contrary, Schmidt's campaign tied Kelly with President Joe Biden by focusing on national issues such as the increase in inflation and gas prices, portraying them as "big-spending liberals". Other issues include criminal justice and transgender people in sports.

Aside from state Supreme Court justice retention elections and other statewide elections, the election was also held on the same ballot as two referendums for proposed constitutional amendments. Question 1 would authorize the state legislature to veto any rules and regulations implemented by Kansas's executive branch with a simple majority. The proposal was spearheaded by Schmidt in 2021 in response to Governor Kelly's pandemic-related measures to close schools temporarily and he made COVID-19 lockdowns and mandates as a focal point in his platform. Kelly's campaign countered that the amendment would be a "power grab" that could create further gridlock in the state's legislative process. Question 2 would require most sheriffs to be elected directly by voters and that they could only be removed by a recall election or a challenge by the state Attorney General. In a press release, Schmidt said that he would campaign for the amendment, arguing that electing sheriffs would make them "uniquely accountable to the people". Critics pointed out that the amendment could create abuse of power as the authority to investigate the sheriff would be stripped from district attorneys in every county and the Attorney General could "play favorites" into which sheriff to investigate. In the end, Question 1 failed narrowly by a one-point margin, while Question 2 passed with 62% of the vote.

Predictions

Endorsements

Polling
Aggregate polls

Graphical summary

Debates and forums

Results 

Laura Kelly won the election by a margin of 2.2 percentage points over Derek Schmidt, similar to the percentage of votes that independent Dennis Pyle received. Kansas Republican Party Chair Mike Kuckelman pointed to this as evidence that Pyle was somewhat responsible for Schmidt's defeat. However, Pyle insisted that "Kansas needed a strong conservative candidate" and instead highlighted Schmidt's underperformance compared to other Republican candidates in Kansas.

Kelly's personal popularity was also a factor in her victory, where a majority of voters approved of Kelly's job performance, while only a third did so for President Joe Biden. Her win was also propelled by Democratic candidates' increased strength in suburban areas, such as Johnson County, in spite of Schmidt's increased vote share from 2018 in the Republican strongholds of rural Kansas.

See also
 Elections in Kansas
 Political party strength in Kansas
 Kansas Democratic Party
 Kansas Republican Party
 Government of Kansas
2022 United States Senate election in Kansas
 2022 United States House of Representatives elections in Kansas
2022 Kansas House of Representatives election
 2022 Kansas elections
2022 United States gubernatorial elections
 2022 United States elections

Notes

Partisan clients

References

External links
Official campaign websites
 Seth Cordell (L) for Governor 
 Laura Kelly (D) for Governor
 Dennis Pyle (I) for Governor
 Derek Schmidt (R) for Governor

2022
Kansas
Governor